Henry Augustus Weaver (April 1, 1820 – September 26, 1890) was Mayor of Pittsburgh from 1857 to 1860.

Life
Henry A. Weaver was born in Freeport, Pennsylvania. His father was Benjamin Weaver, Sheriff of Allegheny County in 1840. Henry Weaver had been manager of the Madison Coal Company. He was a staunch Republican. The term of office was extended to two years while Weaver was mayor.

President Abraham Lincoln appointed Weaver as Collector of Internal Revenue for Western Pennsylvania. Weaver is said to have had a souvenir rail that Lincoln split. Later in life, Weaver was a real estate dealer.

Weaver died at the St. James Hotel; and was buried in Allegheny Cemetery.

See also

List of mayors of Pittsburgh

Sources
Political Graveyard

1820 births
1890 deaths
Mayors of Pittsburgh
Pennsylvania Republicans
Burials at Allegheny Cemetery
19th-century American politicians
People from Freeport, Pennsylvania